North Denes Airport  is a heliport that is located in the northern suburbs of Great Yarmouth, just off the A149 next to Yarmouth Stadium, formerly used as a base for services to the gas platforms in the southern North Sea. Fixed-wing aircraft were not permitted to use the heliport. The heliport was owned by CHC Helicopter, which operated several AgustaWestland AW139 helicopters.

History

There had been private fixed-wing flying from North Denes since 1950, but helicopter flying began there on 22 April 1965, with the arrival of a Westland Whirlwind belonging to Bristow Helicopters, which had won the contract to fly personnel and equipment to Gulf Oil's drilling ship Glomar IV operating in the southern North Sea. The number of helicopters operating from there soon rose to six, with a staff of over 50. By the early 1970s Bristow was serving over 30 offshore installations, carrying more than 5,000 passengers a month. Bristow remained the main operator from North Denes, although Trinity House, British Airways, and the search-and-rescue helicopters from RAF Coltishall also flew from there. In 1990 Bristow celebrated 25 years at North Denes, having transported 181,377 passengers, 1,810 bags and 1,356 tons of freight that year. However, in 1997 Bristow began to operate flights from Norwich International Airport and Den Helder in the Netherlands, and in 1999 it relocated its operations entirely to Norwich. Bond Helicopters acquired some of Bristow's contracts, and became the main operator out of North Denes in 2000, before being acquired by CHC Scotia. In 2009, about 30,000 passengers passed through the heliport.

Closure
CHC planned to close the heliport in 2011 with operations being moved to Norwich, but backed out of the plan to relocate, and instead invested more than £300,000 at North Denes. However, in 2014 Perenco announced that it was relocating from Great Yarmouth to Norwich, and in early 2015, the heliport was deemed "uneconomical" and "un-viable" by the CHC management in writing to the employees following the loss of Perenco contract and it announced the closure of the facility as an heliport. Redundancies were announced on 2 March 2015 to all staff. The final date of closure was not specified, and with "no plans" announced for future operations in Norfolk, CHC will have no presence in the region. All but three pilots were made redundant as from 31 March 2015.

On 1 April 2015, just 1 day after the effective redundancies, CHC management announced the opening of a new facility based at Norwich International Airport (EGSH). This was a surprise to many of the employees who were laid off just the previous day and who claimed that they were still legally employed as their contracts required three months notice. CHC had negotiated a secret deal to relocate their operations and actively decided not to engage with their employees during redundancy procedures. A legal dispute was lodged and CHC made a payment of £200,000 (out of court) to redundant pilots rather than continue their employment.

References

External links

Great Yarmouth (North Denes) (EGSD)

Airports in England
Transport in Norfolk
Heliports in England
Great Yarmouth
Airports in Norfolk